Calyce is a genus of beetles in the family Mordellidae, containing the following species:

 Calyce bicolor Blair, 1922
 Calyce cardinalis Blair, 1922
 Calyce fulva Champion, 1891
 Calyce horioni Ermisch, 1942
 Calyce kamerunensis Ermisch, 1942
 Calyce langeri Ermisch, 1942
 Calyce maculata Píc, 1911
 Calyce reginae Ermisch, 1942
 Calyce sumatrensis Batten, 1989

References

Mordellidae